Pathiraja Navaratne Wanninayake Mudiyanselage Ranjith Dharmasena (28 March 1943 – 28 January 2018) was a Sri Lankan film director and screenwriter. He has been referred to as a 'rebel with a cause', an ‘enfant terrible of the '70s', and is widely recognized as the pioneer of Sri Lankan cinema’s 'second revolution'.  He is also renowned as an academic, playwright and poet.

Early life 
Educated at Dharmaraja College, Kandy, Pathiraja graduated from the University of Peradeniya with an honours degree in Sinhala and Western Classical Culture in 1967. Subsequently he began work as a lecturer in Drama and Performance Arts, and later obtained a PhD in Bengali cinema from Monash University. His thesis was The Dialectic of Region and Nation in the Films of Bengali Independents: Ghatak, Ray and Sen (2001). He learned the language of cinema from the film society movement, which was popular in Sri Lanka in the early sixties. He also recognized their sociopolitical limitations in a country which was heading into a period of deep turmoil. He also studied the cinema of radical activists like Jean-Luc Godard, Third Cinema filmmakers like Fernando Solanas and Glauber Rocha, and Asians like Mrinal Sen, Satyajit Ray and Ritwik Ghatak.

First wave of success (1970–1977)
Pathiraja made a short 10-minute film titled Saturo in 1970. His full-length feature film Ahas Gauwa followed four years later. Dealing with the urban lower class, the film was atypical of most commercial films of that period. It was critically well-received, sweeping the FCJAC Awards landing Best Picture, Best Director and Best Actor and winning the Office Catholique Internationale Du Cinema (Sri Lanka) awards for Best Film and Best Director.

1975's Eya Dan Loku Lamayek was Sri Lanka's entry at the 9th Moscow International Film Festival, winning a Special Diploma for Female Performance in 1976 and the Special award from the peace council of the USSR to be screened at the 18th Venice Film Festival in Bergamo, Italy in 1975.

1978's Bambaru Avith is widely considered Pathiraja's masterpiece. That year it represented Sri Lanka at the 10th Moscow International Film Festival and was screened at the Venice and Los Angeles Film Festivals. In Sri Lanka it was awarded Best Director and Best Film honors at the first Presidential Film Awards and the OCIC Awards. In 1997 a special council selected to celebrate 50 years of Sri Lankan Cinema named it the fourth best Sri Lankan film of all-time.

Middle period (1977–1981)
Later that year, Pathiraja made the Tamil film Ponmani shown at the International Film Festival in India. 1980 saw the filming of Para Dige which was shown some time later at UCLA in the Third World Cinema Program and in France and Melbourne.

1981's Soldadu Unnahe would be Pathiraja's last film for 13 years. It was Sri Lanka's entry to the 8th International Film Festival of India and was awarded Best Film, Best Director and best Script at the third Presidential Film Awards and Best Director and Best Film at the OCIC Awards. OCIC named it the best Sri Lankan film of the 1980 –1990 period in 1990.

Return to film (1994–2002)
1994's Wasuli was a relatively minor film. In 2001 Pathrija returned on a bigger scale with Mathu Yam Dawasa, shown at the Singapore International Film Festival and the 4th Osian's Cinefan Festival of Asian and Arab Cinema, New Delhi.

Academic career
Dharmasena Pathiraja started his academic career at the University of Kelaniya as an assistant lecturer. Later he worked as a lecturer in several Sri Lankan universities, including, University of Jaffna, University of Ruhuna and University of Colombo. Dharmasena Pathiraja was also the Chairman of Sri Lanka Media Training Institute.

Theatergraphy
1970 Kora saha Andaya (The Lame and the Blind) script. Produced by Dhamma Jagoda.
1971 Putu (The Chairs of Eugène Ionesco) Translator and director. It won best translation script in the state drama festival in 1971.

Filmography 

Unscreened Feature
1981      Sira Kandavura
1983      Shelton Saha Kanthi
1994      Whirl Wind (Vasuli) [Colour]

Shorts and Documentaries

2006      In Search of a Road [Colour]
1988      Shelter For Million Families – A 15 mts documentary produced to commemorate the International Year of Shelter for the Homeless, Screened at ST. Anne's Theatre, London on the occasion of the ceremonial award presentation for the best housing program of the year won by Sri Lanka. 1988. (35mm Colour)
1984      Putting The Last First – A documentary on local level community based projects for NORAD (35 mm Colour)
1974      The Coast (Werala) A 30 mts documentary on coast conservation for the Ministry of Fisheries, 1974. ( 35 mm Colour)
1972      Anduren Eliyata – From Darkness to Light,A 40 mts documentary on Land Reforms, produced for the Ministry of Agriculture and Land Reforms. 1972 (35mm -Black and White)
1969      Enemies (Sathuro) [B&W]

Television dramas(series)
1985      Gangulen Egodata -Crossing the Stream
1986      Maaya Mandira – Mansion of Maya. 1986, 27mts.Tele feature For National TV.
1988      Ella langa Walawwa – The House By the Waterfall. 1988,14 (27mts) episodes, Tele Drama for the National TV
1989      Wanni Hamilage Kathawa – Story of Wannihamy,4 (27mts) episodes, Tele docu drama 
1989      Sudubandelage Kathawa- Story of Sudu Banda,2 (30mts) episodes Tele docu-drama 
1989      Pura Sakmana-2 (45mts) episodes Tele Drama, An adaptation of Anton Chekhov's Lady with the Dog for National TV
1992      Kadulla-The Hurdle-21 (26 mts) episodes, Tele Drama, Won 9 UNDA international awards (Sri Lanka Office) Including Best TV Feature, Best Director, Best Script, Best Male and Female Performances, of the year 1992
1993      Suba Anagathyak-16 (26mts) episodes, Tele Drama, An Adaptation of Charles Dicken's Great Expectations for National TV 
1994      Nadunana Puttu- Unknown Sons,21 (26mts) episodes, Tele Drama, for ITN
1996      Durganthaya- 34 (26mts) episodes, Tele Drama, An adaptation of Emily Brontë's Wuthering Heights 
2009      Kampitha Vil

Publications  
 struggle between the form and the content of Sinhalese theatre(Sinhala Naatye Aakruthiyahaa Anthargathayaathara Aragalaya), 2017
Kora Saha Andaya and vangagiriya, original plays, 2017
Putu,Sinhala translation of a play by Eugene Ionesco, 2017
 Pedro paramo, translation of a novel, 2012

References

External links
Sri Lanka Sinhala Films Database – Dharmasena Pathiraja

One League of Social Consciousness:Dharmasena Pathiraja Speaks
Conversation with Sri Lankan Director Dharmasena Pathiraja 
Pathiraja back with Prince Siddhartha

1943 births
2018 deaths
Sri Lankan film directors
Sri Lankan screenwriters
Sri Lankan radio writers
Alumni of Dharmaraja College
Alumni of the University of Peradeniya
Academic staff of the University of Colombo
Alumni of the University of Ceylon
People from Kandy
Kala Keerthi